Vyacheslav Alekseyevich Andreyuk (11 April 1945, in Moscow – 23 February 2010) was a Soviet football player.

Honours
 Soviet Top League winner: 1965.

International career
Andreyuk made his debut for USSR on 23 October 1966 in a friendly against East Germany.

External links
  Profile

1945 births
Soviet Top League players
FC Torpedo Moscow players
FC Ural Yekaterinburg players
2010 deaths
Russian footballers
Soviet Union international footballers
Soviet footballers
Footballers from Moscow

Association football defenders